"Después Que Te Perdí" is a song by Puerto Rican rapper Jon Z and Spanish singer Enrique Iglesias. The song was released on March 13, 2019.

Background
This is another version of Jon Z's original version. Jon Z's original version was released on 15 February 2019.

Music video
The music video for the song was released on March 13, 2019.

Charts

Release history

References

2019 singles
2019 songs
Jon Z songs
Enrique Iglesias songs
Spanish-language songs
Songs written by Enrique Iglesias